Pier Ferdinando Casini (born 3 December 1955) is an Italian politician. He served as President of the Chamber of Deputies from 2001 to 2006.

Casini is the honorary president of the Centrist Democrat International and the Inter-Parliamentary Union. From 1993 to 2001, he served as secretary of Christian Democratic Centre, while from 2002 until 2016 he was the leader of Union of the Centre. Being elected to the Chamber of Deputies in 1983 for the first time, Casini is the longest-serving member of the parliament in Italy.

Early life and career
Casini was born in Bologna in 1955. His father Tommaso was an Italian literature teacher and a local leader of the Christian Democracy (DC), while his mother Mirella was a librarian. Casini has also two sisters and one brother.

After having attended the classical lyceum Luigi Galvani, in 1979 he graduated with a degree in law at the University of Bologna. During these years he joined the Christian Democracy, like his father, and he was elected to the national directorate of the party's youth wing. In 1980, Casini was elected municipal councillor in his hometown, Bologna, a traditional stronghold of the Italian Communist Party (PCI), the DC' historic rival.

Political career

Beginnings within the Christian Democracy
In the 1983 Italian general election, at only 28 years old, Casini was elected to the Chamber of Deputies, becoming one of the youngest members of the parliament. He run in the multi-member constituency of Bologna, gaining more than 34,000 votes. During his first years as deputy, he became a close advisor of Arnaldo Forlani, one of the most prominent leaders of the DC, head of the conservative faction of the party. When Forlani was elected secretary of the DC in February 1989, he appointed Casini in the national directorate of the party. In the 1987 Italian general election, he was re-elected with more than 52,000 votes and appointed vice president of the so-called "Massacres Commission", focused on the terrorist attacks perpetrated in Italy during the Years of Lead. In the 1992 election, Casini was once again elected in Bologna's constituency with 50,000 votes.

Leader of Christian Democratic Centre

In 1993, at the beginning of the secretariat of Mino Martinazzoli, the Christian Democracy was overwhelmed by investigations on Tangentopoli corruption scandal and mafia trial of the long-time Christian democratic leader, Giulio Andreotti. The party suffered a serious consensus crisis, and Casini, together with Clemente Mastella, took positions against Martinazzoli, leaning towards an alliance with Forza Italia (FI), a new conservative political party founded by the media magnate Silvio Berlusconi, the Italian Social Movement (MSI) of Gianfranco Fini and Umberto Bossi's Northern League (LN), aiming at forming a centre-right coalition in opposition to the centre-left one built around the post-communist Democratic Party of the Left (PDS).

On 18 January 1994, along with other Christian democrats who opposed the party's transformation into the Italian People's Party (PPI), Casini founded the Christian Democratic Centre (CDC). On the same day, he was appointed secretary of the party. In the 1994 general election, the CCD run in a joint list with Forza Italia as a member of the Pole of Freedoms in Northern Italy and the Pole of Good Government in Southern Italy, and gaining 27 deputies and 12 senators. Casini was elected in the closed list constituency of Emilia-Romagna. When Berlusconi's first government lost the support of Lega Nord, Casini did not support the newly formed technocratic cabinet of Lamberto Dini.

In the 1996 Italian general election, Casini's CDC formed a joint list with Rocco Buttiglione's United Christian Democrats (CDU). However, the election was characterized by a strong aftermath of the centre-left coalition, The Olive Tree, led by Romano Prodi. Casini was elected with nearly 40,000 votes in the single-member constituency of Maglie, in Apulia region. From 1996 to 2001, he strongly opposed the centre-left governments which ruled the country.

President of the Chamber of Deputies

In 2001, Casini's CDC joined the House of Freedoms alliance, once again led by Berlusconi. The centre-right coalition largely won the 2001 election and Casini was elected to the Chamber for Pomezia's district, with 56,000 votes. On 31 May 2001, he was elected President of the Chamber of Deputies; at 46 years old, he was one of the youngest ever.

On 14 November 2002, Casini was the protagonist of a historical event that never happened before: the visit of a Pope to Palazzo Montecitorio, the seat of the Chamber of Deputies. Casini and Senate's president, Marcello Pera, invited Pope John Paul II to the house.

On 6 December 2002, the CDC formed, along with Buttiglione's UDC and Sergio D'Antoni's European Democracy (DE), the Union of Christian and Centre Democrats (UDC). Casini, who was serving as the president of the Chamber of Deputies, could not be appointed secretary of the party and he would never be; however, from 2002 until 2016 when he left the party, Casini would be the most recognisable figure and de facto leader of UDC.

Leader of Union of the Centre
On 28 January 2006, Casini was elected president of the Christian Democratic International (IDC), succeeding José María Aznar, a position that he held until July 2015. During the electoral campaign for the 2006 Italian general election, Casini hypothesized together with Gianfranco Fini, an alternative candidate for the position of Prime Minister, if UDC and Fini's National Alliance (AN) had reached a larger number of votes than those of Berlusconi's party. The UDC in fact inserted Casini's name in the new electoral symbol. However, the 2006 election was narrowly won by the centre-left coalition of Romano Prodi, who became the new Prime Minister.

Tensions between UDC and House of Freedoms became clear on 2 December 2006, when the centre-right parties, united in opposition to Prodi's cabinet, nevertheless organized two different demonstrations: Berlusconi, Fini and Bossi led the protest through Rome, while Casini and other leaders of UDC spoke in Palermo. During these years, Casini was sometimes spoken of as a possible successor to Berlusconi himself as leader of the coalition. However, as the campaign for the 2008 general election began, Casini officially detached himself from Berlusconi's coalition, refusing to enter his new People of Freedom (PdL) party, preferring to contest the election alone. In a speech to his party, Casini said that "not everyone is for sale", in a not so veiled statement about Berlusconi's political tactics. Casini ran on a purely 'centrist' platform, expanding the UDC into the Union of the Centre (UdC) along with Savino Pezzotta's White Rose. The election was won by the centre-right coalition and became Prime Minister once again. The Union of the Centre gained 5.6% of votes and Casini was elected in the multi-member constituency of Liguria.

After the election, Casini relaunched his plan for a new centrist party, as an alternative to both the PdL and the newly created Democratic Party. Casini long criticised the PdL for not being "Catholic" enough, particularly criticising Berlusconi, who once spoke of "anarchy of values" in describing the catch-all nature of the PdL, and Gianfranco Fini, who was known for his social-liberal stance on stem-cell research, abortion and right-to-die issues, and explicitly wooed the "Christian democrats of the PD" to join him.

In the 2009 European Parliament election in Italy, the UdC won 6.5% of the votes, while in the 2010 regional elections, UdC chose to form alliances both with the centre-right and the centre-left (or stood alone) in different regions, depending on local conditions, losing ground everywhere but in those southern regions where it was in alliance with the centre-right. In December 2010, Casini was among the was a founding father of New Pole for Italy (NPI), along with Fini's newly born Future and Freedom (FLI) and the Francesco Rutelli's Alliance for Italy. The NPI's aim was to form a third distinct bloc from the centre-right and the centre-left.

In November 2011, Berlusconi resigned as Prime Minister and Mario Monti formed a new technocratic government. Casini was a strong supporter of Monti's policies and, in the 2013 Italian general election, his party joined With Monti for Italy coalition, alongside FLI and Monti's Civic Choice (SC). The election resulted however in a huge defeat for the UdC, which obtained a mere 1.8% of the vote, eight deputies and two senators. Casini was elected in the Senate for the first time, within the multi-member constituency of Campania.

Within the centre-left coalition
In 2013, Casini supported the grand coalition cabinet of Enrico Letta and, in February 2014, the new centre-left government of Matteo Renzi. In the run-up of the 2016 Italian constitutional referendum, strongly supported by Renzi, the UdC chose to campaign for "No", while Casini was among the keenest supporters of "Yes". After the referendum, which saw a defeat of the "Yes" side, the UdC withdrew its support for Renzi. However, some UdC splinters, notably including Casini and minister Gian Luca Galletti, launched "Centrists for Italy" and confirmed their alliance with the Angelino Alfano's New Centre-Right, in support of the centre to centre-left cabinet. Renzi resigned due to the referendum's lost and Paolo Gentiloni became the new Prime Minister.

The new party was officially founded in February 2017 and named Centrists for Europe (CpE). In December 2017 the CpE launched the Popular Civic List (CP), within the centre-left coalition, along with Popular Alternative (AP), Italy of Values (IdV), Solidary Democracy (DemoS) and minor parties. The new leader of AP, Beatrice Lorenzin, was chosen as leader of the list too. In the 2018 Italian general election, the CP obtained a mere 0.5%, but Casini was re-elected to the Senate with nearly 122,000 votes from a single-seat constituency in Bologna, thanks to the decisive support of the PD.

In the 2022 Italian presidential election, Casini was considered one of the most reliable candidates but later asked to rule out his name and vote for the incumbent president Sergio Mattarella.

Personal life
In 1982, Casini married Roberta Lubich, with whom he had two daughters, Maria Carolina and Benedetta. The coupled divorced in 1998 and he started dating Azzurra Caltagirone, daughter of the famous Roman entrepreneur and publisher Francesco Gaetano Caltagirone, who he married in 2007 and with whom he has other two children, Caterina and Francesco. They divorced in 2016.

Casini is a fan of Bologna F.C. 1909 and Virtus Bologna, respectively the football and basketball teams of his hometown.

Electoral history

First-past-the-post elections

Honours and awards 
  : Honorary Grand Commander of the Order of the Defender of the Realm (2003)
 : Grand Cordon of the Medal of the Oriental Republic of Uruguay (2003)

References

External links

|-

|-

1955 births
Living people
Politicians from Bologna
Italian Roman Catholics
Christian Democracy (Italy) politicians
Christian Democratic Centre politicians
Union of the Centre (2002) politicians
Centrists for Europe politicians
Presidents of the Chamber of Deputies (Italy)
Deputies of Legislature IX of Italy
Deputies of Legislature X of Italy
Deputies of Legislature XI of Italy
Deputies of Legislature XII of Italy
Deputies of Legislature XIII of Italy
Deputies of Legislature XIV of Italy
Deputies of Legislature XV of Italy
Deputies of Legislature XVI of Italy
Senators of Legislature XVII of Italy
Senators of Legislature XVIII of Italy
Candidates for President of Italy